Clio. Femmes, genre, histoire (formerly ) is a French biannual peer-reviewed academic journal, specialized in women's social history and gender history, covering all periods.

Originally published by the Presses University of Toulouse-Jean Jaurès, in Toulouse, with the support of the French National Centre for Scientific Research and the Centre national du livre, this French-language journal offers a gendered analysis of society. Except for the last six issues, the others are fully available on the journal's website (hosted by OpenEdition Journals, in open access. The most recent issues are available for a fee per article on Cairn.info. The journal was established in 1945 as "", obtaining its current name in 2013. Also since that year, the journal added an online English-language version, Clio, Women, Gender, History.

Abstracting and indexing
The journal is abstracted and indexed in:
EBSCO databases
Index Islamicus
Modern Language Association Database
Scopus

References

External links

Publications established in 1995
History journals
Women's history
Feminist journals